Bakwa-Kasanga is a town in central Democratic Republic of the Congo.

Transport 

The town is served by a station on the national railway network.

See also 

List of railway stations in the Democratic Republic of the Congo

References 

Geography of the Democratic Republic of the Congo